Drouais primarily refers to a person from the French commune of Dreux.

Drouais is also the surname of a family of French painters:
François-Hubert Drouais
Hubert Drouais
Jean Germain Drouais